Finer is a surname, and may refer to:

 Hagar Finer, Israeli boxer
 Herman Finer (1898–1969), British administrative-scholar
 Jem Finer musician/composer
 Sir Morris Finer, lawyer
 Leslie Finer, journalist
 Samuel Finer (1915–93), historian of government
 Sarah Dawn Finer, singer, songwriter, and actress
 Stephen Finer, artist